The Cleveland-Rogers House, located in what is now Lexington, Kentucky at 8151 Richmond Rd., was listed on the National Register of Historic Places in 1980.  Also known as Riverside Farm, the listing included two contributing buildings and a contributing structure.

A log cabin on the property was built in 1786.

The main house is a one-and-a-half-story, five bay, brick building, built c. 1819.  The front facade's brick is laid in Flemish bond;  common bond is used elsewhere.

It is a contributing building in the Boone Creek Rural Historic District, NRHP-listed in 1994.

References

Houses on the National Register of Historic Places in Kentucky
Federal architecture in Kentucky
Houses completed in 1819
Houses in Lexington, Kentucky
Individually listed contributing properties to historic districts on the National Register in Kentucky
1819 establishments in Kentucky
National Register of Historic Places in Lexington, Kentucky
Farms on the National Register of Historic Places in Kentucky
Log cabins in the United States